The Whisper Aircraft Whisper motor glider is a South African two-seat kit aircraft that was designed by Russell Phillips in 2004 and is produced by Whisper Aircraft of Port Elizabeth. Major assemblies are completed at the factory with assembly intended to be completed by the owner. It is powered by a four-cylinder Limbach L2000 aero engine with options for the  Jabiru 2200 and  Rotax 912 available.

The design was developed into the Whisper X350 Generation II kit aircraft in 2015.

Specifications

See also
Europa XS
Grob G 109

References

External links

Motor gliders
2000s South African sport aircraft
Homebuilt aircraft
Low-wing aircraft
Single-engined tractor aircraft